Ishkulovo (İşqol) is a rural locality (a selo) and the administrative center of Ravilovsky Selsoviet, Abzelilovsky District, Bashkortostan, Russia. The population was 1,257 as of 2010. There are 11 streets.

Geography 
Ishkulovo is located 23 km south of Askarovo (the district's administrative centre) by road. Tepyanovo is the nearest rural locality.

References 

Rural localities in Abzelilovsky District